The Potter County Courthouse in Gettysburg, South Dakota was built in 1911.  Gettysburg won a war vs. an alternative county seat location.  The Second Renaissance Revival-style building has Classical Revival-style influences.  It was listed on the National Register of Historic Places in 1986.

The courthouse was designed by the Black Hills Company, a Deadwood-based architecture firm operated by architect John P. Eisentraut. The contractors were Stolte & Mencier of Redfield

Gettysburg was established as county seat after bitter dispute with Forest City, South Dakota.  Forest City refused to give up the official papers of the county;  Frank M. Byrne, later a governor of the state, was involved in a raid to obtain the papers.

It is a three-story building.

References

Courthouses on the National Register of Historic Places in South Dakota
Neoclassical architecture in South Dakota
Government buildings completed in 1911
National Register of Historic Places in Potter County, South Dakota